This is a list of people who have played for the Indonesian professional football club Persib Bandung.

Foreign players 

Europe
  Maciej Dołęga (2003)
  Piotr Orliński (2003)
  Mariusz Mucharski (2003)
  Paweł Bocian (2003)
  Leo Chițescu (2008)
  Miljan Radović (2011–2012)
  Zdravko Dragićević (2011)
  Vladimir Vujović (2014–2017)
  Ilija Spasojević (2015)
  Juan Belencoso (2016)
  Carlton Cole (2017)
  Bojan Mališić (2018–2019)
  Rene Mihelič (2019)
  Kevin van Kippersluis (2019)
  Nick Kuipers (2019–)
  Geoffrey Castillion (2020–)

South America
  Rodrigo Sanhueza (2003)
  Claudio Lizama (2003–2004)
  Alejandro Tobar (2003–2004)
  Rodrigo Lemunao (2003)
  Julio Lopez (2004)
  Angelo Espinosa (2004)
  Adrián Colombo (2004)
  Osvaldo Moreno (2004)
  Cristian Molina (2004)
  Antônio Cláudio (2005–2006)
  Uilian Souza (2005)
  Patricio Jiménez (2007–2008)
  Lorenzo Cabanas (2007–2009)
  Fábio Lopes (2008)
  Rafael Bastos (2008–2009)
  Hilton Moreira (2008–2011, 2013)
  Cristian Gonzáles (2009–2011)
  Christian René Martínez (2009–2010)
  Pablo Francés (2010)
  Márcio Souza (2012)
  Robertino Pugliara (2016)
  Marcos Flores (2016)
  Jonathan Bauman (2018)
  Fabiano Beltrame (2019–2021)
  Wander Luiz (2020–)

Africa
  Ekene Ikenwa (2005)
  Chioma Kingsley (2005)
  Redouane Barkaoui (2006–2008)
  Ayock Berty (2006)
  Brahima Traoré (2006)
  Nyeck Nyobe (2007, 2008–2009)
  Christian Bekamenga (2007–2008)
  Abanda Herman (2011–2013)
  Moses Sakyi (2011)
  Herman Dzumafo (2013)
  Mbida Messi (2013)
  Makan Konaté (2014–2015)
  Djibril Coulibaly (2014)
  Michael Essien (2017)
  Ezechiel N'Douassel (2017-2019)

Asia
  Pradit Taweechai (2005–2006)
  Nipont Chanarwut (2006)
  Sinthaweechai Hathairattanakool (2006, 2009)
  Suchao Nuchnum (2009)
  Satoshi Ōtomo (2010)
  Baihakki Khaizan (2010)
  Shahril Ishak (2010)
  Shohei Matsunaga (2011, 2017)
  Robert Gaspar (2011–2012)
  Noh Alam Shah (2012)
  Naser Al Sebai (2013)
  Kenji Adachihara (2013)
  Diogo Ferreira (2016)
  Oh In-Kyun (2018)
  Artur Geworkýan (2019)
  Omid Nazari (2019–2021)
  Farshad Noor (2021)
  Mohammed Bassim (2021–)

Indonesian players

 Max Timisela
 Anas Wiradikarta
 Kwee Kiat Sek
 Aang Witarsa
 Sunar
 Jahja
 Aten
 Sunarnoyo
 Emen Suwarman
 Sharunah
 Willy Ang Ching Siang
 Hafid Sijaya Hasan
 Sunarto
 Fattah Hidayat
 Rukma Sudjana
 Wowo Sunaryo
 Omo Suratmo
 Hengki Timisela
 Djadjang Nurdjaman
 Robby Darwis
 Sutiono Lamso
 Yusuf Bachtiar
 Anwar Sanusi
 Yudi Guntara
 Suwandi Siswoyo
 Budiman Yunus
 Peri Sandria
 Ansyari Lubis
 Nandang Kurnaedi
 Muhammad Halim
 Imam Riyadi
 Yaris Riyadi
 Imran Nahumarury
 Nur'Alim
 Gendut Doni
 Alexander Pulalo
 Aliyudin
 Yandri Pitoy
 Budi Sudarsono
 Isnan Ali
 Harry Saputra
 Charis Yulianto
 Bayu Sutha
 Muhammad Ilham
 Nova Arianto
 Muhammad Ridwan
 Maman Abdurahman
 Eka Ramdani
 Airlangga Sutjipto
 Jajang Sukmara
 Mohammad Nasuha
 Cristian Gonzáles
 Sergio van Dijk
 Muhammad Taufiq
 Tantan
 Samsul Arif
 I Made Wirawan
 Firman Utina
 Atep
 Hariono
 Zaenal Arief
 Supardi Nasir
 Markus Horison
 Achmad Jufriyanto
 Zulkifli Syukur
 Tony Sucipto
 Abdul Rahman
 Ferdinand Sinaga
 Zulham Zamrun
 Yandi Sofyan
 Dedi Kusnandar
 Kim Jeffrey Kurniawan
 Muhammad Natshir
 Yanto Basna
 Gian Zola
 Febri Haryadi
 Raphael Maitimo
 Henhen Herdiana
 Victor Igbonefo

Only played in junior squad

  Jajang Mulyana
  Hanif Sjahbandi
  Ryuji Utomo
  Sutanto Tan
  I Nyoman Adi Parwa
  Abdul Aziz
  Andritany Ardhiyasa
  Johan Juansyah

References

External links 
  
 The Official Indonesian Football Association website
 Indonesia on FIFA
 Timnas Indonesia Fans Site on FIFA

Persib Bandung players
Persib Bandung
Association football player non-biographical articles
Persib Bandung